Myśl.pl (Polish for "Idea.pl") is a Polish right-wing journal founded by Ireneusz Fryszkowski in 2006.

The Crew
Editor: Ireneusz Fryszkowski
Publicists: Ján Čarnogurský, Sylwester Chruszcz, Łukasz Czuma, Dariusz Grabowski, Bogumił Grott, Lech Haydukiewicz, Tadeusz Isakowicz-Zaleski, Karol Kaźmierczak, Mieczysław Ryba, Aleksander Stralcov-Karwacki, Grzegorz Strauchold, Marian Szołucha, Łukasz Trzeciak, Rafał Wiechecki, Artur Zawisza
Authors: Jens-Peter Bonde, Wojciech Cejrowski, Wiesław Chrzanowski, Janusz Dobrosz, Stanisław Gawłowski, Dag Hartelius, Tadeusz Iwiński, Marek Kawa, Hans Michael Kofoed-Hansen, Janusz Korwin-Mikke, Ghervazen Longher, Stanisław Michalkiewicz, Andrzej Pilipiuk, Paweł Poncyljusz, Libor Rouček, Radosław Sikorski, Anna Sokołowa, Wojciech Szczurek, Adam Szejnfeld, Jan Szyszko, Thomas Woods, Krzysztof Zaremba.

References

External links
The Myśl.pl’s website

2006 establishments in Poland
Cultural magazines
Magazines established in 2006
Mass media in Szczecin
Polish-language magazines
Political magazines published in Poland
Quarterly magazines